Peter Cave Hollow is a valley in Iron County in the U.S. state of Missouri.

Peter Cave Hollow most likely was so named on account of deposits of saltpetre.

References

Valleys of Iron County, Missouri
Valleys of Missouri